Vance Bryden Gerry (August 21, 1929 – March 5, 2005) was an American storyboard artist, concept artist, and character designer known for his work on One Hundred and One Dalmatians (1961), The Sword in the Stone (1963), The Jungle Book (1967), The Aristocats (1970), The Rescuers (1977), and The Lion King (1994). He also operated his own letterpress printing business called Weather Bird Press.

Biography
Gerry was born in Pasadena, California. A self-described poor student, he attended University School in Pasadena to complete his high school studies. There, he stated, "Teachers usually liked my artwork in grammar school, watercolors and crayons and so on. So I had sort of always thought that I would be a commercial artist." Gerry then enrolled in Woodbury College and attended Art Center School for less than one semester before he was drafted into the United States Army. He served as a Corporal during the Korean War and left in 1952.

Following his military service, he studied at the Chouinard Art Institute on a scholarship from the G.I. Bill. One of his teachers there was Donald W. Graham, who had taught animation training and orientation classes at Walt Disney Productions during the 1930s. He attended there for two and a half years. Realizing he would not make it professionally as an illustrator, Gerry was persuaded by his friend, Grant Dahlstrom, to work for him as a salesman. Graham, instead, recommended that he should work for Walt Disney Productions. In 1955, Gerry first worked as an assistant in-betweener. He then transitioned to being a layout artist in which he worked on One Hundred and One Dalmatians (1961) and The Sword in the Stone (1963). During the development on The Jungle Book (1967), he transitioned again into working in the story department.

Meanwhile, Gerry began his printmaking career in 1963, in which he founded the Peach Pit Press. Five years later, his wife suggested changing the name to the Weather Bird Press, which he operated in Laguna Beach, California. Back at Disney, Gerry returned to doing layout artwork for The Rescuers (1977) and The Fox and the Hound (1981) before leaving to continue running his letterpress printing business in 1977. He briefly returned to Disney for The Black Cauldron (1985) where he created early designs for the Horned King. Gerry envisioned him as a big-bellied Viking who had a red beard, fiery temper, and wore a steel helmet with two large horns. He left the studio again, but returned to work on The Great Mouse Detective (1986). By the 1990s, Gerry worked one day a week on the studio's in-development projects, in which he contributed visual development and character design artwork on The Lion King (1994), Pocahontas (1995), The Hunchback of Notre Dame (1996), Tarzan (1999), and Home on the Range (2004).

Describing his working method, Gerry stated, "It doesn't take much to get started. I'd just as soon start with a title of a picture and just start dreaming into it. A script is restricting because it tells you too much. I'd rather start earlier than that and look for possibilities for animation and entertainment, rather than story elements or structure." Towards the end of his career, he worked closely with fellow storyboard artists Joe Grant and Burny Mattinson. Gerry retired from Disney to continue working at Weather Bird Press with his longtime friend Patrick Roeh.

Death and legacy
On March 5, 2005, Gerry died at the age of 75 from complications of cancer in Pasadena, California.  

Commemorating his passing, Don Hahn stated: "He was a writer's writer and his sense of storytelling and influence on all of us was profound." Floyd Norman, who had worked alongside Gerry during the 1950s and 1960s, wrote the following: "His whole approach to Disney story telling was so uncomplicated. In an era when young story artists pontificate endlessly about their story telling prowess, Vance was an intuitive story teller who seem to allow the story to flow out of him."

Filmography

References

Further reading

External links

20th-century American writers
21st-century American writers
1929 births
2005 deaths
American animators
American storyboard artists
American publishers (people)
Chouinard Art Institute alumni
Deaths from cancer in California
Letterpress printmakers
People from Pasadena, California
Walt Disney Animation Studios people